The Armenian Premier League (known as the VBET Armenian Premier League for sponsorship reasons) is the top football competition in Armenia. From 1936 to 1991, the competition was held as a regional tournament within the USSR. After independence, the Football Federation of Armenia has been the unit in charge. Over the years, the league has evolved into a small league consisting of ten teams. The winner of the league is awarded a spot in the first qualifying round of the UEFA Champions League.

Current teams

Soviet era champions

1936	Dinamo Yerevan
1937	Dinamo Yerevan
1938	Spartak Yerevan
1939	Spartak Yerevan
1940	Spartak Yerevan
1941–44 Not Played
1945	Spartak Yerevan
1946	Dinamo Yerevan
1947	Dinamo Yerevan
1948	Dinamo Yerevan
1949	Dinamo Yerevan
1950	Urozhai Yerevan
1951	Shinarar Yerevan
1952	Spartak Yerevan
1953	Karmir Drosh Leninakan (Krasnoe Znamya)
1954	Spartak Yerevan
1955	Khimik Kirovakan
1956	FIMA Yerevan
1957	Karmir Drosh Leninakan (Krasnoe Znamya)
1958	FIMA Yerevan
1959	FIMA Yerevan
1960	Tekstilshchik Leninakan
1961	Tekstilshchik Leninakan
1962	Tekstilshchik Leninakan
1963	Lokomotiv Yerevan
1964	Khimik Kirovakan
1965	Araks Yerevan
1966	Elektrotekhnik Yerevan
1967	Kotayk
1968	Araks Yerevan
1969	Araks Yerevan
1970	Motor Yerevan
1971	FIMA Yerevan
1972	Zvezda Yerevan
1973	Kotayk
1974	FIMA Yerevan
1975	Kotayk
1976	Kotayk
1977	Araks Yerevan
1978	Kanaz Yerevan
1979	Aragats Leninakan
1980	Aragats Leninakan
1981–86 Not Played
1987   Aragats Leninakan
1988	Elektrotekhnik Yerevan
1989	FC Kapan
1990	  Ararat-2 Yerevan
1991   Syunik Kapan

Winners

Performance by club

Notes
 Homenetmen Yerevan is the former name of Pyunik Yerevan..
 Tsement Ararat is the former name of Araks Ararat.
 Banants is the former name of Urartu.

Sponsorship names 
VBET Armenian Premier League (2020–2022)
Fastex Armenian Premier League (2022-present)

Broadcaster

References

External links
 FIFA.com: Table
 RSSSF: Armenian Premier League Seasons
 Armenian Premier League directory

Armenian Premier League
1
Armenia
1992 establishments in Armenia